Marashli Ali Pasha was an Ottoman Empire governor, serving as the Vizier of Belgrade (Sanjak of Smederevo) in ca. 1815. He succeeded Suleyman Pasha.

References

Sources

Governors of the Ottoman Empire
19th-century people from the Ottoman Empire
Viziers
Ottoman Serbia
Second Serbian Uprising
Ottoman military personnel of the Serbian Revolution